Uganda competed in the 2002 Commonwealth Games in Manchester. It was their eleventh time at the games. It sent 13 male and 7 female athletes to the games.

Medals

Silver
Boxing:
 Joseph Lubega Men's Light Heavyweight Division (81kg)
 Mohammed Kayongo Men's Light Welterweight Division (63.5kg)

See also
2002 Commonwealth Games results

References

2002
2002 in Ugandan sport
Nations at the 2002 Commonwealth Games